Bobo Stenson (born Bo Gustav Stenson; 4 August 1944) is a Swedish jazz pianist. The Bobo Stenson Trio, formed in collaboration with Anders Jormin (bass) and Jon Fält (drums), has been in existence for four decades.

Career
Stenson studied with Werner Wolf for 15 years, starting at the age of 8.

In 1963, Stenson stepped up from the local scene in Västerås to begin playing frequently in Stockholm, where he accompanied a long line of visiting American players including Sonny Rollins, Stan Getz and Gary Burton. He also worked closely with Don Cherry from the beginning of the trumpeter's residency in Scandinavia.

The 1970s was an intensive period for Stenson, playing in many groups, amongst them the long-standing band Rena Rama with Palle Danielsson, and a trio with Arild Andersen and Jon Christensen; later also with Jan Garbarek. In 1988, he joined the Charles Lloyd quartet and since 1996 has appeared at major jazz festivals with Tomasz Stańko's septet/sextet.

Discography

As leader
Underwear (ECM, 1971)
The Sounds Around the House (Caprice, 1983)
Very Early (Dragon, 1986)
Reflections (ECM, 1993)
War Orphans (ECM, 1997)
Serenity (ECM, 1999)
Goodbye (ECM, 2005)
Cantando (ECM, 2007)
Indicum (ECM, 2012)
Contra la Indecisión (ECM, 2018)

As sideman
With Don Cherry
 Dona Nostra (ECM, 1993)
With Jan Garbarek
 Sart (ECM, 1971)
 Witchi-Tai-To (ECM, 1973)
 Dansere (ECM, 1975)
With Charles Lloyd
 Fish Out of Water (ECM, 1989)
 Notes from Big Sur (ECM, 1991)
 The Call (ECM, 1993)
 All My Relations (ECM, 1994)
 Canto (ECM, 1996)
With Red Mitchell
 One Long String (Mercury, 1969)
With Rena Rama
 Jazz I Sverige (Caprice, 1973)
 Landscapes (JAPO, 1977)
 Inside – Outside (Caprice, 1979)
 Live (Organic, 1983)
 New Album (Dragon, 1986)
 Rena Rama with Marilyn Mazur (Dragon, 1989)
 The Lost Tapes (Amigo, 1998) with Kenny Wheeler & Billy Hart
With George Russell
 Listen to the Silence (Soul Note, 1971)
With Terje Rypdal
 Terje Rypdal (ECM, 1971)
With Tomasz Stanko
 Bossanova and Other Ballads (Gowi, 1993)
 Matka Joanna (ECM, 1994)
 Leosia (ECM, 1996)
 Litania: Music of Krzysztof Komeda (ECM, 1997)
 With Thomas Strønen
Rica - Challenge Records (2004)
Parish- ECM Records (2005)

With Others
 Agram (Moller/Willemark)
 Xieyi (Jormin)
 Change of Heart (Speake)
 Parish (Stronen)
 La Nuit de Wounded Knee (Doudou Gouirand)

References

External links
Bobo Stenson video interview at Allaboutjazz.com
 Bobo Stenson on ECM Records
 Bobo Stenson discography at Discogs

1944 births
Living people
people from Västerås
ECM Records artists
Swedish jazz pianists
Litteris et Artibus recipients
21st-century pianists
21st-century Swedish male musicians
Male jazz musicians
Rena Rama members